EF-hand calcium-binding domain-containing protein 6 is a protein that in humans is encoded by the EFCAB6 gene.

Interactions
EFCAB6 has been shown to interact with PARK7 and Androgen receptor.

References

Further reading

EF-hand-containing proteins